The 1990 Stanley Cup playoffs for the National Hockey League (NHL) championship began on April 5, 1990, following the 1989–90 regular season. The sixteen teams that qualified, from the top four teams of the four divisions, played best-of-seven series. The Conference Champions played a best-of-seven series for the Stanley Cup.

This was the last time that the Detroit Red Wings missed the playoffs until 2017.  They would make the playoffs for 25 consecutive seasons from 1991 to 2016, excluding 2005, when the season was cancelled.

Since entering the NHL as expansion teams in the 1967–68 NHL season this was the first and only time to date that both the Philadelphia Flyers and Pittsburgh Penguins missed the playoffs in the same season.

The playoffs concluded on May 24 with the Edmonton Oilers winning the Stanley Cup, defeating the Boston Bruins in the final series four games to one. Edmonton goaltender Bill Ranford was awarded the Conn Smythe Trophy as Most Valuable Player of the playoffs.

Playoff seeds

The following teams qualified for the playoffs:

Prince of Wales Conference

Adams Division
 Boston Bruins, Adams Division champions, Prince of Wales Conference regular season champions, Presidents' Trophy winners – 101 points
 Buffalo Sabres – 98 points
 Montreal Canadiens – 93 points
 Hartford Whalers – 85 points

Patrick Division
 New York Rangers, Patrick Division champions – 85 points
 New Jersey Devils – 83 points
 Washington Capitals – 78 points
 New York Islanders – 73 points

Clarence Campbell Conference

Norris Division
 Chicago Blackhawks, Norris Division champions – 88 points
 St. Louis Blues – 83 points
 Toronto Maple Leafs – 80 points
 Minnesota North Stars – 76 points

Smythe Division
 Calgary Flames, Smythe Division champions, Clarence Campbell Conference regular season champions – 99 points
 Edmonton Oilers – 90 points
 Winnipeg Jets – 85 points
 Los Angeles Kings – 75 points

Playoff bracket

Division Semifinals

Prince of Wales Conference

(A1) Boston Bruins vs. (A4) Hartford Whalers
This was the first playoff series between these two teams.

(A2) Buffalo Sabres vs. (A3) Montreal Canadiens
This was the fourth playoff series between these two teams. Buffalo won two of the previous three meetings, including the most recent meeting in a three-game sweep in the 1983 Adams Division Semifinals.

(P1) New York Rangers vs. (P4) New York Islanders
This was the seventh playoff series meeting between these two teams. The Islanders won five of the previous six meetings. The most recent the Islanders won 3–2 in the 1984 Patrick Division Semifinals.

(P2) New Jersey Devils vs. (P3) Washington Capitals
This was the second playoff meeting between these two teams. New Jersey won their only previous meeting in seven games in the 1988 Patrick Division Finals.

Clarence Campbell Conference

(N1) Chicago Blackhawks vs. (N4) Minnesota North Stars
This was the fifth playoff series meeting between these two teams. Chicago won three of the previous four meetings, including the most recent meeting in six games in the 1985 Norris Division Finals.

(N2) St. Louis Blues vs. (N3) Toronto Maple Leafs
This was the third playoff series meeting between these two teams. Both teams split their first two meetings. Toronto won the most recent meeting in six games in the 1987 Norris Division Semifinals.

(S1) Calgary Flames vs. (S4) Los Angeles Kings
This was the third straight and fifth overall playoff meeting between these two teams. Both teams split the previous four meetings. Calgary won last year's Smythe Division Finals in a four-game sweep.

(S2) Edmonton Oilers vs. (S3) Winnipeg Jets
This was the sixth playoff meeting between these two teams. Edmonton won all five previous meetings, including their most recent in the 1988 Smythe Division Semifinals in five games.

Division Finals

Prince of Wales Conference

(A1) Boston Bruins vs. (A3) Montreal Canadiens
This was the 25th playoff series meeting between these two teams. Montreal lead the all-time meetings 21–3. This was also the seventh straight year meeting in the playoffs, with Montreal winning last year's Adams Division Finals in five games.

(P1) New York Rangers vs. (P3) Washington Capitals

This was the second playoff series meeting between these two teams. New York won the only previous meeting in six games in the 1986 Patrick Division Finals.

Clarence Campbell Conference

(N1) Chicago Blackhawks vs. (N2) St. Louis Blues
This was the third straight and seventh overall playoff meeting between these two teams. Chicago won five of the prior six meetings, including last year's Norris Division Finals in five games.

(S2) Edmonton Oilers vs. (S4) Los Angeles Kings
This was the second straight and fifth overall playoff meeting between these two teams. The teams split the previous four meetings. Los Angeles won last year's Smythe Division Semifinals in seven games.

Conference Finals

Prince of Wales Conference Final

(A1) Boston Bruins vs. (P3) Washington Capitals
This was the first playoff meeting between these two teams.

Clarence Campbell Conference Final

(S2) Edmonton Oilers vs. (N1) Chicago Blackhawks
This was the third playoff series meeting between these two teams. Edmonton won both prior playoff meetings, including the most recent in six games in the 1985 Clarence Campbell Conference Final.

Stanley Cup Finals

This was the second Finals meeting between these two teams. Edmonton won the only previous meeting sweeping the Bruins in the 1988 Stanley Cup Finals. 

The Edmonton Oilers defeated the Boston Bruins in five games. For the Oilers, it was their fifth Cup win in seven years, and their only one without Wayne Gretzky. In Game 1, Petr Klima scored at 15:13 of the third overtime period to give the Oilers a 3–2 win. The game broke the record for longest Finals game, set in 1931 between Chicago and Montreal. This game remains the longest in Stanley Cup Finals history (Longest NHL overtime games) to date, edging both Brett Hull's cup-winner in 1999 and Igor Larionov's game-winner in 2002 by less than 30 seconds. In Game 5 at the Boston Garden on May 24, the Oilers won 4–1, with Craig Simpson scoring the game-winning goal.

Playoff statistics

Skaters
These are the top ten skaters based on points.

Goaltenders
This is a combined table of the top five goaltenders based on goals against average and the top five goaltenders based on save percentage, with at least 420 minutes played. The table is sorted by GAA, and the criteria for inclusion are bolded.

See also
1989–90 NHL season
List of NHL seasons

Notes

References

 

Stanley Cup playoffs
playoffs